The Sicamous Eagles are a Junior "B" Ice Hockey team based in Sicamous, British Columbia, Canada. They are members of the Doug Birks Division of the Okanagan/Shuswap Conference of the Kootenay International Junior Hockey League (KIJHL). They play their home games at Sicamous & District Recreation Centre.

History

1994-2003: Early years

The Eagles were founded in 1994, and finished their first season with a record of 36-8. They would win the KIJHL championship over the Castlegar Rebels in the playoffs. The following year, they would finish with a similar record of 35-6-1, losing to Castlegar in the finals again. In 1996-97, they finished third in the Eddie Mountain Division, with a record of 21-21. The following year, they finished fourth in their division, losing in the first round of the playoffs. In 1998-99, they improved to second in the Eddie Mountain Division, behind only the North Okanagan Kings. In 1999-00, they finished second in their division again, and lost to the Nelson Leafs in the league championship. The following year, the Eagles were finished second in their division again, before losing in the second round of the playoffs to the Revelstoke Grizzlies. In 2001-02, the Eagles won the KIJHL championship for the second time, led by the KIJHL's most accomplished alumnus, Shea Weber. They defeated the Beaver Valley Nitehawks 3-1 in the final. They then went on to win the Keystone Cup as British Columbia's top Junior B team. They would win the regular season title again the following year, but lost to Beaver Valley in the championship.

2003-present: Recent history

The Eagles finished second in the Okanagan-Shushwap Division for the 2003-04 season, with a record of 31-12-4-3, losing in the Division finals to Osoyoos. They lost in the first round the following season to Revelstoke. But in 2005-06, the Eagles won the league title for a third time, defeating Beaver Valley in the final again. The Eagles have yet to win another league title. The 2006-07 Eagles suffered a considerable drop in form, finishing fourth in the Okanagan-Shushwap Division, and losing in the first round to the Kamloops Storm. The following year, the divisions of the KIJHL were re-organized, and the Eagles were moved to the Eddie Mountain Conference, East Division. They finished second in their division, but lost in the Division finals to the Revelstoke Grizzlies. In 2008-09, the league was again re-sorted, and the Eagles finished second in the new Okanagan Division. They would lose in the first round to Kamloops. The following season, they finished third in the Okanagan Division, before losing in the second round to the Princeton Posse. In 2010-11, the Eagles were sorted into the new Doug Birks Division, and finished third again, losing to Kamloops in the first round. The following season, the Eagles would finish fourth in their division, and lost in the second round to the Kelowna Chiefs. In 2012-13, the Eagles improved to second in the Doug Birks Division, losing to the North Okanagan Knights in the Division final. 2013-14 saw the Eagles drop to fourth in the Division again, losing 4-1 in the opening round to the Kamloops Storm. The next season would see an identical result, with the Eagles fourth and losing 4-1 to Kamloops, and this marked the first time in franchise history that the Eagles lost in the first round of the playoffs in two consecutive years. Another franchise low occurred in 2015-16, as the Eagles missed the playoffs for the first time in their history, compiling a 10-34-2-6 record, fifth in the Doug Birks Division.

Season-by-season record

Note: GP = Games played, W = Wins, L = Losses, T = Ties, OTL = Overtime Losses, SOL = Shootout Losses, D = Defaults, Pts = Points, GF = Goals for, GA = Goals against

Playoffs

 Notes

 Prior to the 2001-02 KIJHL playoffs, there was three rounds only (Division Semifinals, Division Finals and Finals).

NHL alumni

Kris Beech
Scott Jackson
Andrew Ebbett
Shea Weber
Deryk Engelland
Andrew Kozak
Adrian Veideman

Awards and trophies

Keystone Cup
2001-02

Cyclone Taylor Cup
1994-95
2001-02

KIJHL Championship
1994-95
2001-02
2005-06

Coach of the Year
Blair Robinson: 2005-06
Blair Robinson: 2007-08

Most Sportsmanlike
Ryan Bulach: 2005-06
Tyler Krause: 2007-08

Most Valuable
Mark Arnold: 2010-11

Top Goaltender
Chad Trouton: 2005-06

Top Rookie
Dustin Sylvester: 2004-05
Ryan Bulach: 2005-06

References

External links
Official website of the Sicamous Eagles

Ice hockey teams in British Columbia
1994 establishments in British Columbia
Ice hockey clubs established in 1994
Columbia-Shuswap Regional District